Asclepias is a genus of herbaceous, perennial, flowering plants known as milkweeds, named for their latex, a milky substance containing cardiac glycosides termed cardenolides, exuded where cells are damaged. Most species are toxic to humans and many other species, primarily due to the presence of cardenolides, although, as with many such plants, there are species that feed upon them (e.g., their leaves) and from them (e.g., their nectar). Most notable are monarch butterflies, who use and require certain milkweeds as host plants for their larvae.

The genus contains over 200 species distributed broadly across Africa, North America, and South America. It previously belonged to the family Asclepiadaceae, which is now classified as the subfamily Asclepiadoideae of the dogbane family, Apocynaceae.

The genus was formally described by Carl Linnaeus in 1753, who named it after Asclepius, the Greek god of healing.

Flowers

Members of the genus produce some of the most complex flowers in the plant kingdom, comparable to orchids in complexity. Five petals reflex backwards revealing a gynostegium surrounded by a five-membrane corona. The corona is composed of a five-paired hood-and-horn structure with the hood acting as a sheath for the inner horn. Glands holding pollinia are found between the hoods. The size, shape and color of the horns and hoods are often important identifying characteristics for species in the genus Asclepias.

Pollination in this genus is accomplished in an unusual manner. Pollen is grouped into complex structures called pollinia (or "pollen sacs"), rather than being individual grains or tetrads, as is typical for most plants. The feet or mouthparts of flower-visiting insects, such as bees, wasps, and butterflies, slip into one of the five slits in each flower formed by adjacent anthers. The bases of the pollinia then mechanically attach to the insect, so that a pair of pollen sacs can be pulled free when the pollinator flies off, assuming the insect is large enough to produce the necessary pulling force (if not, the insect may become trapped and die). Pollination is effected by the reverse procedure, in which one of the pollinia becomes trapped within the anther slit. Large-bodied hymenopterans (bees, wasps) are the most common and best pollinators, accounting for over 50% of all Asclepias pollination, whereas monarch butterflies are poor pollinators of milkweed.

Asclepias species produce their seeds in pods termed follicles. The seeds, which are arranged in overlapping rows, bear a cluster of white, silky, filament-like hairs known as the coma (often referred to by other names such as pappus, "floss", "plume", or "silk"). The follicles ripen and split open, and the seeds, each carried by its coma, are blown by the wind. Some, but not all, milkweeds also reproduce by clonal (or vegetative) reproduction.

Selected species 

There are also 12 species of Asclepias in South America, among them: A. barjoniifolia, A. boliviensis, A. curassavica, A. mellodora, A. candida, A. flava, and A. pilgeriana.

Deprecated
 Calotropis gigantea (L.) W.T.Aiton (as A. gigantea L.)
 Calotropis procera (Aiton) W.T.Aiton (as A. procera Aiton)
 Cynanchum louiseae Kartesz & Gandhi (as A. nigra L.)
 Cynanchum thesioides (Freyn) K.Schum. (as A. sibirica L.)
 Funastrum clausum (Jacq.) Schltr. (as A. clausa Jacq.)
 Gomphocarpus cancellatus (Burm.f.) Bruyns (as A. cancellatus Burm.f. or A. rotundifolia Mill.)
 Gomphocarpus fruticosus (L.) W.T.Aiton (as A. fruticosa L.)
 Marsdenia macrophylla (Humb. & Bonpl. ex Willd.) E.Fourn. (as A. macrophylla Humb. & Bonpl. ex Schult.)
 Marsdenia tenacissima (Roxb.) Moon (as A. tenacissima Roxb.)
 Matelea maritima (Jacq.) Woodson (as A. maritima Jacq.)
 Sarcostemma acidum (Roxb.) Voigt (as A. acida Roxb.)
 Sarcostemma viminale (L.) R.Br. (as A. viminalis (L.) Steud.)
 Telosma cordata (Burm.f.) Merr. (as A. cordata Burm.f.)
 Telosma pallida (Roxb.) Craib (as A. pallida Roxb.)
 Tylophora indica (Burm.f.) Merr. (as A. asthmatica L.f.)
 Vincetoxicum hirundinaria Medik. (as A. vincetoxicum L.)
 Vincetoxicum pycnostelma Kitag. (as A. paniculata Bunge)
 Xysmalobium undulatum (L.) R.Br. (as A. undulata L.)

Ecology
Milkweeds are an important nectar source for native bees, wasps, and other nectar-seeking insects, though non-native honey bees commonly get trapped in the stigmatic slits and die. Milkweeds are also the larval food source for monarch butterflies and their relatives, as well as a variety of other herbivorous insects (including numerous beetles, moths, and true bugs) specialized to feed on the plants despite their chemical defenses.

Milkweeds use three primary defenses to limit damage caused by caterpillars: hairs on the leaves (trichomes), cardenolide toxins, and latex fluids. Data from a DNA study indicate that, generally, more recently evolved milkweed species ("derived" in botany parlance) use these preventive strategies less but grow faster than older species, potentially regrowing faster than caterpillars can consume them.

Research indicates that the very high cardenolide content of Asclepias linaria reduces the impact of the Ophryocystis elektroscirrha (OE) parasite on the monarch butterfly, Danaus plexippus. The OE parasite causes holes to form in the wings of fully developed monarch butterflies, Danaus plexippus, this causes weakened endurance and an inability to migrate. The parasite only affects monarchs when they are larvae and caterpillars, but the detriment is when they are in their butterfly form. By contrast, some species of Asclepias are extremely poor sources of cardenolides, such as Asclepias fascicularis, Asclepias tuberosa, and Asclepias angustifolia.

Monarch butterfly conservation and milkweeds 
The leaves of Asclepias species are a food source for monarch butterfly larvae and some other milkweed butterflies. These plants are often used in butterfly gardening and monarch waystations in an effort to help increase the dwindling monarch population.

However, some milkweed species are not suitable for butterfly gardens and monarch waystations. For example, A. curassavica, or tropical milkweed, is often planted as an ornamental in butterfly gardens outside of its native range of Mexico and Central America. Year-round plantings of this species in the United States are controversial and criticised, as they may lead to new overwintering sites along the U.S. Gulf Coast and the consequent year-round breeding of monarchs. This is thought to adversely affect migration patterns, and to cause a dramatic build-up of the dangerous parasite, Ophryocystis elektroscirrha. New research also has shown that monarch larvae reared on tropical milkweed show reduced migratory development (reproductive diapause), and when migratory adults are exposed to tropical milkweed, it stimulates reproductive tissue growth.

Because of this, it is most often suggested to grow milkweeds that are native to the geographical area they are planted in to prevent negative impacts on monarch butterflies.

Monarch caterpillars do not favor butterfly weed (A. tuberosa), perhaps because the leaves of that milkweed species contain very little cardenolide. Some other milkweeds may have similar characteristics.

Uses
Milkweeds are not grown commercially in large scale, but the plants have had many uses throughout human history. Milkweeds have a long history of medicinal, every day, and military use. The Omaha people from Nebraska, the Menomin from Wisconsin and upper Michigan, the Dakota from Minnesota, and the Ponca people from Nebraska, traditionally used common milkweed (A. syriaca) for medicinal purposes.
The bast fibers of some species can be used for rope. The Miwok people of northern California used heart-leaf milkweed (A. cordifolia) for its stems, which they dried and used for cords, strings and ropes.

A study of the insulative properties of various materials found that milkweed floss was outperformed by other materials in terms of insulation, loft, and lumpiness, but it scored well when mixed with down feathers. The milkweed filaments from the coma (the "floss") are hollow and coated with wax, and have good insulation qualities. Milkweed is grown commercially as a hypoallergenic filling for pillows and as insulation for winter coats.
Asclepias is also known as "Silk of America" which is a strand of common milkweed (A. syriaca) gathered mainly in the valley of the Saint Lawrence River in Canada. The silk is used in thermal insulation, acoustic insulation, and oil absorbents.

Milkweed latex contains about two percent latex, and during World War II both Nazi Germany and the US attempted to use it as a source of natural rubber, although no record of large-scale success has been found.

Many milkweed species also contain cardiac glycoside poisons that inhibit animal cells from maintaining a proper K+, Ca2+ concentration gradient. As a result, many peoples of South America and Africa used arrows poisoned with these glycosides to fight and hunt more effectively. Some milkweeds are toxic enough to cause death when animals consume large quantities of the plant. Some milkweeds also cause mild dermatitis in some who come in contact with them. Nonetheless, some species can be made edible if properly processed.

References

External links
 Milkweed test-cultivated for the insulation value of floss
 Milkweed in Handbook of Energy Crops
 Common milkweed production research at Western Illinois University
 UVSC Herbarium — Asclepias

 
Apocynaceae genera
Butterfly food plants
Taxa named by Carl Linnaeus
Symbols of Illinois